Voyages: The Trans-Atlantic Slave Trade Database is a database hosted at Rice University that aims to present all documentary material pertaining to the transatlantic slave trade. It is a sister project to African Origins.

The database breaks down the kingdoms or countries who engaged in the Atlantic trade, summarized in the following table:

By 2008, the project had gathered data on nearly 35,000 transatlantic slave voyages from 1501 to 1867. For each voyage they sought to establish dates, owners, vessels, captains, African visits, American destinations, numbers of slaves embarked, and numbers landed. They have been able to find much of this material for an estimated 80 percent of the entire transatlantic African slave trade. With corrections for missing voyages, the Project has estimated the entire size of the transatlantic slave trade with more comprehension, precision, and accuracy than before. They reckon that in 366 years, slaving vessels embarked about 12.5 million captives in Africa, and landed 10.7 million in the New World. A horrific discovery is a careful estimate that the Middle Passage took a toll of more than 1.8 million African lives. In this quantitative database, the numbers are enslaved people.

See also
 The 1619 Project

References

External links
 

African diaspora
Databases
African slave trade
European colonization of the Americas
European colonisation in Africa
Early modern period
Forced migration
History of sugar
Slave trade
History of the Caribbean
Slavery in North America
Slavery in South America
Slavery in the British Empire
Slavery in the United States
Trade routes